is the 4th album by J-pop idol group Berryz Kobo, released on August 1, 2007 in Japan, and May 25, 2008 in South Korea. The first press of the CD came with 8 interchangeable covers, as well as solo shots of each of the 7 members.

Track listings

CD
 
 
 
 Performed by Chinami Tokunaga, Maasa Sudo and Yurina Kumai.
 "Very Beauty"
 
 
 Performed by Momoko Tsugunaga and Risako Sugaya.
 
 
  
 Performed by Saki Shimizu and Miyabi Natsuyaki.

Limited edition DVD
 
 "Very Beauty"

Featured line-up
Saki Shimizu
Momoko Tsugunaga
Chinami Tokunaga
Miyabi Natsuyaki
Maasa Sudo
Yurina Kumai
Risako Sugaya

Charts

References

External links
4th Ai no Nanchara Shisū at the official Hello! Project discography (Japanese)
4th Ai no Nanchara Shisū at the official Up-Front Works discography (Piccolo Town)
4th Ai no Nanchara Shisū at J-pop Stop

Berryz Kobo albums
Piccolo Town-King Records albums
2007 albums